Orthotomicus is a genus of typical bark beetles in the family Curculionidae. There are about nine described species in Orthotomicus.

Species
These nine species belong to the genus Orthotomicus:
 Orthotomicus caelatus (Eichhoff, 1868) i c b
 Orthotomicus erosus Bright & Skidmore, 1997 c g b (Mediterranean pine engraver)
 Orthotomicus laricis (Fabricius, J.C., 1792) c g
 Orthotomicus latidens Wood & Bright, 1992 c g b
 Orthotomicus mannsfeldi Wachtl, 1879 c g
 Orthotomicus proximus Eichhoff, 1867 c g
 Orthotomicus spinifer (Eichhoff, 1878) c b
 Orthotomicus suturalis Gyllenhal, 1827 c g
 Orthotomicus tridentatus Eggers, 1921 g
Data sources: i = ITIS, c = Catalogue of Life, g = GBIF, b = Bugguide.net

References

Further reading

External links

 

Scolytinae
Articles created by Qbugbot